The Arundel Manuscripts are a collection of manuscripts purchased by the British Museum in 1831 which are now part of the manuscript collection of the British Library.

The manuscripts were collected by Thomas Howard, 2nd Earl of Arundel. In 1666, his grandson, Lance Henry Howard, divided the collection between the College of Arms and the Royal Society and in 1831, the manuscripts held by the Royal Society were purchased by the British Museum.

References

Further reading
Catalogue of Manuscripts in the British Museum, New Series, vol. I, part 1, The Arundel Manuscripts. London, 1834.

British Library Arundel collection